The Renaissance Ross Bridge Golf Resort and Spa is a 259-room resort, equipped with fine dining, a championship golf course, and a  full service spa. The hotel is managed by PCH Hotels and Resorts, Inc. and is a franchise of Marriott International.

The resort is located on the newest Robert Trent Jones Golf Trail location and is part of a chain of courses owned and operated by the Retirement Systems of Alabama. It is located near Birmingham, Alabama in the suburb of Hoover. Ross Bridge claims the second longest golf course in the world at 8,191 yards. From 2006 through 2009, Ross Bridge was the host course of a PGA Champions Tour golf tournament, the Regions Charity Classic.

Ross Bridge is one of three hotels in the state of Alabama to receive its four diamond rating from AAA. Travel + Leisure named it one of the top 500 hotels in the world.

Landmarks in Alabama
Golf clubs and courses in Alabama
Sports in Hoover, Alabama
Buildings and structures in Jefferson County, Alabama
Tourist attractions in Jefferson County, Alabama